The names for archaeological periods in the list of archaeological periods vary enormously from region to region. This is a list of the main divisions by continent and region. Dating also varies considerably and those given are broad approximations across wide areas.

The three-age system has been used in many areas, referring to the prehistorical and historical periods identified by tool manufacture and use, of Stone Age, Bronze Age and Iron Age. Since these ages are distinguished by the development of technology, it is natural that the dates to which these refer vary in different parts of the world. In many regions, the term Stone Age is no longer used, as it has been replaced by more specific geological periods. For some regions, there is need for an intermediate Chalcolithic period between the Stone Age and Bronze Age. For cultures where indigenous metal tools were in less widespread use, other classifications, such as the lithic stage, archaic stage and formative stage refer to the development of other types of technology and social organization.

Historical periods denotes periods of human development with the advantage of the development of writing. Written records tend to provide more socio-political insight into the dominant nations, and hence allow categorization according to the ruling empires and cultures, such as Hellenistic, Roman, Viking. Inevitably these definitions of periods only relate to the region of that empire or culture.

The Industrial Age or Modern era is generally taken to refer to post-1800. From this time, the industrial revolution which began in Western Europe resulted in global trade and greatly increased cultural exchange.

Archaeological period articles – by continent and region

See also 
 List of time periods

Periods
 
Periodization